The 1900 Centre football team represented Centre College as an independent the 1900 college football season. Led by Ralph C. Hamill in his first and only season as head coach, Centre compiled a record of 4–1–1. The team outscored its opponents 54 to 17. The first game of the season, against Cincinnati, was cancelled after 15 minutes of play due to lightning.

Schedule

References

Centre
Centre Colonels football seasons
Centre football